The Rialto Theatre is a historic performing venue at 117 East Cedar Street in downtown El Dorado, Arkansas.  Built in 1929 during El Dorado's oil boom years, the theater is one of the best local examples of Classical Revival architecture, and is one of the largest and most elaborately decorated performing spaces in southern Arkansas.  It was designed by the local firm of Kolben, Hunter and Boyd, and seats 1400.  Its main entrance has Egyptian Revival details, and is flanked by storefronts.  The brick of the front facade is laid in a basketweave pattern, and is topped by a stone frieze, cornice, and parapet.  The interior of the theater is elaborately decorated.  The theater was owned for many years by the McWilliams family. It was closed from 1980 to 1987 and then reopened as a three-screen movie theater that operated until 2006. The main lobby and concessions area operated briefly as a bar called Marilyn’s. In 2012, it was purchased by the Murphy Arts District, who announced plans to restore it in phase two of its plans for revitalizing downtown El Dorado. The theater, which will have floor seating for 850 in addition to a full balcony, will host a variety of musical acts, plays, comedy shows, and movies.

References

Theatres on the National Register of Historic Places in Arkansas
Theatres completed in 1929
Buildings and structures in El Dorado, Arkansas
Individually listed contributing properties to historic districts on the National Register in Arkansas
National Register of Historic Places in Union County, Arkansas
1929 establishments in Arkansas
Egyptian Revival architecture in Arkansas
Egyptian-style theaters